is a Japanese actress, singer, and fashion model. She is known for acting in Death Note 2: The Last Name (2006), Arakawa Under the Bridge (2010) and 20th Century Boys 1: Beginning of the End (2008).

Katase portrayed Kiyomi Takada in Death Note: The Last Name. She also portrayed Megumi Yokota as an adult (with Mayuko Fukuda who played the role of a younger Megumi Yokota) as one of at least thirteen Japanese citizens kidnapped by North Korea in the late 1970s and early 1980s in Saikai: Yokota Megumi-san no Negai. She also played Mayumi in the fifth installment of the PlayStation series by Sega, Yakuza.

Filmography

Films
Between Calmness and Passion (2001)
Death Note: The Last Name (2006), Kiyomi Takada
Calling You (2007), Ryo Harada
20th Century Boys 1: Beginning of the End (2008), Mika Shikishima
20th Century Boys 2: The Last Hope (2009), Mika Shikishima
20th Century Boys 3: Redemption (2009), Mika Shikishima
Trick The Movie: Psychic Battle Royale (2010)
 (2010), Prosecutor Mari Hasebe
Gene Waltz (2011), Miki Tanaka
Arakawa Under the Bridge (2012), Maria
Ushijima the Loan Shark (2012), Chiaki Okubo
Hentai Kamen (2013)
Hentai Kamen: Abnormal Crisis (2016)
I Am a Hero (2016), Tekko

TV dramas
Great Teacher Onizuka Special as Yamaguchi Rika (Fuji TV, 1999)
 (TV Asahi, 1999)
 (Fuji TV, 1999)
 (Fuji TV, 2000, episode 7)
 (NTV, 2000)
 (Fuji TV, 2001)
 (Fuji TV, 2001)
Pretty Girls (TBS, 2002)
 (TBS, 2003, episode 2)
Last Christmas (TBS, 2004)
 (Fuji TV, 2005, episodes 4-5, 7)
 (Fuij TV, 2005)
 (TV Asahi, 2005)
 (Fuji TV, 2006)
 (NTV, 2006)
 (TBS, 2006)
 (NTV, 2007)
 (TBS, 2007)
 (Fuji TV, 2007)
 (TV Asahi, 2007)
Miracle Voice (TBS, 2008)
Average (Fuji TV, 2008)
 (NTV, 2008, episode 7)
Average 2 (Fuji TV, 2008)
Bloody Monday (TBS, 2008)
 (TV Asahi, 2009)
 (WOWOW, 2009)
Ghost Friends (NHK, 2009)
 Drama Special Love Stories VI (NTV, 2009)
 (Fuji TV, 2010)
Pro Golfer Hana (NTV, 2010)
Hammer Session! (TBS, 2010, episode 8)
 (TBS, 2010)
Diplomat Kuroda Kosaku (Fuji TV, 2011)
 (TBS, 2011)
Arakawa Under the Bridge (TBS, 2011)
 (Fuji TV, 2012)

Video games
Yakuza 5 (2012), Mayumi

Discography

Singles
 2002: Galaxy/Telepathy/Fantasy
 2003: Babe
 2003: Shine/Revenge
 2003: Necessary/Every
 2004: Meu amor é...
 2004: Kindan no Telepathy

Albums
 2003: Telepathy
 2004: Extended
 2005: Reloaded: Perfect Singles

DVD
 2005: Reloaded: Perfect Visuals

References

External links
 

Living people
Japanese women pop singers
Japanese female models
Actresses from Tokyo
1981 births
Avex Group artists
Singers from Tokyo
Ken-On artists
21st-century Japanese singers
21st-century Japanese women singers
Models from Tokyo Metropolis